Pylyp Harmash (born April 21, 1989) is a professional Ukrainian volleyball player of the Lokomotyv Kharkiv in Ukrainian Super League. Harmash was previously a member of the Ukraine men's national volleyball team.

Career
In 2020 Harmash returned to the Lokomotyv Kharkiv.

Sporting achievements

Clubs 
Ukrainian Championship:
  2010/11, 2011/12, 2012/13, 2013/14, 2014/15, 2015/16, 2016/17
Ukrainian Cup:
  2010/11, 2011/12, 2012/13, 2013/14, 2014/15, 2015/16

Individual 
 2013/2014 Best libero  Ukrainian Super League
 2016/2017 Best libero  Ukrainian Supercup

References

External links

1989 births
Living people
Ukrainian men's volleyball players
VC Lokomotyv Kharkiv players
Sportspeople from Poltava